This article lists various career, tournament, and seasonal achievements by Serbian tennis player Novak Djokovic.

Novak Djokovic has won an all-time record 22 Grand Slam men's singles titles, jointly-held with Rafael Nadal. He has been the world No. 1 for a record 380 weeks, and the year-end world No. 1 a record seven times. Djokovic is one of eight male players to achieve the Career Grand Slam and one of four to achieve the Double Career Grand Slam. He is the only player in tennis history to hold all four major titles on three different surfaces at once. He is also the only player to win all four majors, all nine ATP Masters 1000 tournaments, and the ATP Tour Finals in their career, and has achieved this feat twice.

Djokovic is widely viewed by many sports analysts, fans and media pundits as one of the three greatest tennis players of all time, alongside Roger Federer and Rafael Nadal, collectively known as the "Big Three" who have dominated men's tennis for over a decade. He has reached a record 33 Grand Slam finals and played the final of each Grand Slam tournament at least six times, an all-time record. He has won six ATP Tour Finals titles, including a record streak of four consecutive titles from 2012 to 2015.
 
Djokovic's 2011 season is considered one of the greatest seasons by a tennis player in the Open Era. Djokovic won 10 titles on 3 different surfaces and defeated Rafael Nadal and Roger Federer a total of 10 times collectively, his match record being 10–1 against them. Djokovic went on a 41-match win streak and set a then-record of 5 Masters titles won in a season. In 2015 Djokovic won three majors in one season for the second time, improved his record of most Masters won in a season by winning six titles, and finished the year by winning his fourth consecutive Tour Finals title. Djokovic also made the finals of all Big tournaments he played in 2015, defeating 31 Top-10 players along the way (Open Era record) and setting an all-time ATP rankings record (16,950 points). Djokovic holds the records for reaching 15 consecutive finals in a single season, 11 consecutive Masters finals, and 18 straight top-tier tournament finals.

Djokovic has won a record 38 titles in the ATP Masters tournaments. By 2018, he had won Masters titles across all 9 tournaments, becoming the first player to achieve the "Career Golden Masters". As a result, he is considered to be one of the most accomplished player in ATP Masters history for his versatility and success in winning Masters titles on a consistent basis.

Djokovic is widely viewed as one of the greatest hardcourt players of the Open Era. He has the record of most hardcourt Majors and Masters titles.
Djokovic has won 8 titles on grass courts, including 7 Wimbledon titles.
Besides hard courts and grass courts, Djokovic has won 18 titles on clay, including two French Open titles and 11 Masters titles, which is second only to Nadal's (also known as the King of Clay) record of 26. Djokovic is one of two players, along with Robin Söderling, to defeat Nadal at the French Open and the only one to do so twice. He is the only player to defeat Nadal in all three clay-court Masters events and ended Nadal's consecutive run of 8 Monte Carlo titles in the 2013 final. Djokovic is also the only player to defeat Federer and Nadal in all four Grand Slam tournaments.

All-time records 
 These records were attained since the amateur era of tennis, beginning 1877.

In 2009 a new point system was introduced where points were roughly doubled.

Grand Slam tournaments records
 These records were attained in the Open Era of tennis, since 1968.

 Djokovic is one of eight men in tennis history to complete the Career Grand Slam and one of four to complete the Double Career Grand Slam.
 Djokovic is one of six players in the Open Era (Connors, Wilander, Agassi, Federer, Nadal) to win Grand Slams on three different surfaces.

Records at each Grand Slam tournament 
 These records were attained in the Open Era of tennis, since 1968.

 Djokovic is the first and only player in the Open Era to be undefeated in ten Australian Open finals, and holds a perfect 10–0 record.

ATP Masters and ATP Finals records 
 ATP Masters Series was introduced in 1990 as a successor to the "Grand Prix Super Series" which began in 1970.
 ATP Finals was introduced in 1990 as a successor to the "Grand Prix Masters" championship which began in 1970.

 Djokovic is the first and only player to win his first 5 finals at the ATP Finals.

Records at each Masters tournament

Other significant records
 These records were attained in the Open Era of tennis, since 1968.
 The ATP ranking was frozen from 23 March to 23 August 2020

Guinness World Records
As of June 2022, Djokovic holds 23 Guinness World Records.
 Most Australian Open tennis singles titles won (male)
 Most Australian Open singles titles won (open era)
 First tennis player to win three successive Australian Open titles
 First player to achieve a “Career Golden Masters”
 Most weeks ranked number one in singles tennis (male)
 Most ATP Masters 1000 singles titles won in a career
 Most ATP Masters 1000 singles titles won in a season
 Most ATP Masters 1000 singles finals in a season
 Most consecutive Masters 1000 matches won
 Most consecutive men's Grand Slam Singles tennis titles (open era)
 Most consecutive Grand Slam singles matches won (male, open era)
 Fewest matches completed to reach a Grand Slam semi-final
 First male tennis player to win a Grand Slam singles title in three different decades (open era)
 First player to win a Wimbledon men's singles final after saving match points (open era)
 First Grand Slam men's singles final to feature a final-set tie-break
 Most ATP Tour singles matches between two players (open era)
 Most tennis Grand Slam meetings (singles)
 Most consecutive Grand Slam singles final losses by a man [Nadal to Djokovic]
 Longest Grand Slam tennis final
 Longest Wimbledon singles final
 Highest earnings in a tennis season
 Highest earnings in a tennis career (male)
 Highest earnings in a tennis season (male)

Awards and honours

Tennis 
 ITF World Champion (7): 2011, 2012, 2013, 2014, 2015, 2018, 2021
 ATP Player of the Year (7): 2011, 2012, 2014, 2015, 2018, 2020, 2021
 ATP Most Improved Player of the Year (2): 2006, 2007
 ATP Comeback Player of the Year: 2018
 Arthur Ashe Humanitarian of the Year: 2012
 Tennis Player of the Decade: 2010s
 Best Male Tennis Player ESPY Award (5): 2012, 2013, 2015, 2016, 2021

 Davis Cup Commitment Award

Sport awards
 Laureus World Sports Award for Sportsman of the Year (4): 2012, 2015, 2016, 2019
 Olympic Committee of Serbia Sportsman of the Year (9): 2007, 2010, 2011, 2013–2015, 2018–2020
 Sport Golden Badge (4): 2007, 2010, 2011, 2015
 BBC Overseas Sports Personality of the Year: 2011
 L'Équipe World Champion of Champions: 2021
 GQ ACE of the Year: 2011
 AIPS Athletes of the Year: 2011
 AIPS Europe Athletes of the Year – Frank Taylor Trophy (3): 2011, 2012, 2015
 US Sports Academy Male Athlete of the Year (2): 2011, 2014
 Eurosport International Athlete of the Year (3): 2011, 2015, 2021
 PAP European Sportsperson of the Year (4): 2011, 2015, 2018, 2021
 EFE Champion of Champions Award: 2015
 Marca Legend (2016)

Orders
 Order of St. Sava, First Class by Irinej, Serbian Patriarch (2011)
 Order of Karađorđe's Star, First Class by Boris Tadić, President of Serbia (2012)
 Order of the Republika Srpska on Sash by Milorad Dodik, President of Republika Srpska (2013)

Special awards
 Vermeil Medal for Physical Education and Sports by Albert II, Prince of Monaco (2012)
 Centrepoint Great Britain Youth Inspiration Award by Prince William, Duke of Cambridge (2012)
 Key to the City / Honorary Citizen of Zvečan (2011), Banja Luka (2013), Andrićgrad (2015), Nikšić (2021), Budva (2022) and Visoko (2022)
 Honorary Mayor of Rural City of Swan Hill (2016)
 Golden Knight – Sword of Holy Serbian Despot Stefan Lazarević by Prince Michael Karađorđević, Royal Order of Knights (2016)
 Order of Nikola Tesla by Tesla Science Foundation of Philadelphia (2022)

See also
List of career achievements by Roger Federer
List of career achievements by Rafael Nadal
List of career achievements by Andy Murray

Notes

References

achievements
Djokovic, Novak